Lalbaugchi Rani is a 2016 Indian Marathi language slice of life drama film, directed by Laxman Utekar and produced by  Boney Kapoor and Sunil Manchanda under the Mad Entertainment banner. The film was released on 3 June 2016.

It stars Veena Jamkar in lead also Parth Bhalerao and Prathamesh Parab in supporting roles.

Plot
Journey of a 24 year old mentally challenged girl who gets lost in Mumbai. During this unusual adventure, she meets various people from the society and manages to change their lives.

Cast
Veena Jamkar as Sandhya Parulekar
Parth Bhalerao as Govinda
Prathamesh Parab as Andy
Ashok Shinde as Nitin Parulekar
Neha Joshi as Sweety
Nandita Dhuri as Paaro
Pratima Joshi as Mrs Parulekar
Reshma Shinde
Subrat Dutta as Drunk Guy
Suyash Joshi as Sandhya Parulekar's brother
Jaywant Wadkar

References

External links
 

2016 films
Indian drama films
2010s Marathi-language films
Films directed by Laxman Utekar